Sir George Hamilton, 1st Baronet of Donalong and Nenagh ( – 1679), born in Scotland, inherited land in Ireland and fought in the Irish Army under his brother-in-law, the 1st Duke of Ormond, in the Confederate Wars and the Cromwellian conquest of Ireland, during which he defended Nenagh Castle against Henry Ireton. Hamilton was father of Antoine Hamilton, author of the Mémoires du Comte de Grammont, of Richard Hamilton, Jacobite general, and of Elizabeth, Countess de Gramont, "la belle Hamilton".

Birth and origins 
George was born about 1608, probably in Paisley, Renfrewshire, near Glasgow, in the west of Scotland. He was the fourth son of James Hamilton and his wife, Marion Boyd. His father had been created Earl of Abercorn by James VI and I in 1606. His paternal grandfather was the 1st Lord Paisley.

George's mother was the eldest daughter of the 6th Lord Boyd, of Kilmarnock, Ayrshire, in the south-west of Scotland. Both grandfathers fought in 1568 at Langside for Mary, Queen of Scots.

George was one of nine siblings who are listed in his father's article.

George's father had been a Protestant, but his mother, Marion Boyd, was a recusant, who brought him, like all his siblings, up in the Catholic faith. His uncle, Sir George Hamilton of Greenlaw and Roscrea, pushed in the same direction.

Early life 
George was about 11 in 1618 when his father, the 1st Earl of Abercorn, died. His father had been an undertaker in James VI and I's 1611 Plantation of Ulster and had as such acquired large estates in Ireland, mainly around Strabane in the west of County Tyrone. George's eldest brother, James, succeeded to his father's title of Earl of Abercorn, but the Irish lands were shared among the younger sons according to his father's will. Strabane, the most prestigious part, went to George's elder brother Claud. George inherited Donalong, a great proportion (2000 acres). His father had predeceased his paternal grandfather, the 1st Lord Paisley, who died three years later in 1621. George's eldest brother James, the 2nd Earl of Abercorn, inherited at that time the title of Lord Paisley and the family's Scottish lands.

Some time after 1625 Hamilton, together with Sir Basil Brooke and Sir George Russell, acquired rights to the Knockaunderrig Silver Mine at Knockanroe in the Silvermine Mountains at the village of Silvermines, south of Nenagh.

In 1627 Hamilton succeeded Sir Roger Hope to the command of a company of foot in the Irish Army.

Marriage and children 
In 1629 Hamilton married Mary Butler, youngest daughter of Thomas Butler, Viscount Thurles. Her eldest brother, James, later the 1st Duke of Ormond, thereby became his brother-in-law.

 
George and Mary had six sons:
 James (died 1673), became ranger of Hyde Park and lost a leg in a sea-fight
 George (died 1676), killed in French service at the Col de Saverne
 Anthony (1646–1720), fought for the Jacobites and wrote the Mémoires du comte de Grammont
 Thomas (died 1687), served in the Royal Navy and died in Boston, Massachusetts
 Richard (died 1717), fought for the Jacobites and was taken prisoner at the Boyne
 John (died 1691), Colonel in the Irish army, was killed in the Battle of Aughrim

—and three daughters:
 Elizabeth (1641–1708), a famous beauty, married Philibert de Gramont
 Lucia (died 1676), married Sir Donough O'Brien, 1st Baronet, of Leamaneh Castle, a Protestant, in 1674
 Margaret, married in July 1674 Mathew Forde of Seaforde, County Down, and Coolgreany, County Wexford

Midlife 
In 1632 Hamilton's mother died in Edinburgh and was buried with her husband in Paisley Abbey.

Some time before 1634 Hamilton was created a baronet and was called Sir George, but some fault seems to have been found with this creation as he would later be created a baronet for a second time. The territorial designation and the baronetage (country) of this first creation are unknown.

In 1640, Ormond, Hamilton's brother-in-law granted him the manor, castle, town, and lands of Nenagh for 31 years. Ormond also became his boss in the army when he was appointed lieutenant-general (commander-in-chief) of the Irish army in September 1640.

In 1641, at the beginning of the Irish Rebellion, Hamilton was, during a visit to England, suspected of supporting the rebellion as he was Catholic. He was arrested and shortly held at the Tower of London but was soon released on bail.

During the rebellion Hamilton housed at Nenagh Jean Gordon and her children, who had lost their home when Phelim O'Neill burned Strabane Castle in December 1641. She was his sister-in-law, the widow of his elder brother Claude, who had died in 1638.

On 2 February 1642 the Knockaunderrig Silver Mine, which Hamilton operated together with Sir Basil Brooks and Sir William Russell, was attacked by local rebels under the leadership of Hugh O'Kennedy and 32 Protestant English miners seem to have been killed.

On 5 June 1646 Owen Roe O'Neil with the Confederate Ulster army defeated the Covenanters under Robert Monro. O'Neill then marched south to Kilkenny as directed by Rinuccini, the papal nuncio. Leinster and Munster was treated as enemy territory. On 17 September 1646, O'Neill attacked and captured Roscrea, but Nenagh was not attacked at that time. O'Neill then menaced Dublin in November 1646.

It seems that Sir George had been with the King in England. In January 1647 he returned to Dublin with a message instructing Ormond to hand Dublin over to the English rather than the Irish.

Phelim O'Neill took Nenagh in 1648 but it was retaken by Inchiquin in the same year by undermining the castle's wall. Hamilton's family probably fled Nenagh before the siege.

In January 1649 Sir George was appointed receiver-general of the revenues for Ireland succeeding to Lord Roscommon. He was promoted to colonel of foot and upheld the Royalist cause against Cromwell. In 1649 he was appointed governor of Nenagh for his brother in law, James Butler, at that time the Marquess of Ormond, leader of the royalists. At the end of 1650 he defended Nenagh Castle against the Parliamentarian army under Henry Ireton, which attacked it on the way back from the siege of Limerick to their winter quarters at Kilkenny. He surrendered the castle on 10 November 1650 after Ireton had menaced to breach its walls with artillery.

French exile 
His Irish lands were confiscated, and in spring 1651 he and his family followed Ormond into French exile. They first went to Caen where Ormond's wife Elizabeth Preston lived since 1648. Ormond introduced him to Charles II's exile court at the Château de Saint-Germain-en-Laye. His wife went to Paris where she lived in the convent of the Feuillantines. In 1656 or 1657 Charles sent him, together with Donough MacCarty, 2nd Viscount Muskerry, to Madrid on a diplomatic mission.

Restoration and death 
In 1660, after the Restoration, he returned to London and stayed at the court of Charles II at Whitehall. In that same year the king created him Baronet of Donalong and Nenagh for his services to the royal cause. Although several sources mention the creation of the baronetcy, it seems to have never been carried out entirely.

He died in 1679 at the age of 71 or 72 years. He was succeeded by his grandson James Hamilton, 6th Earl of Abercorn, who never assumed the title of Baronet but would later succeed to the earldom of Abercorn.

Notes and references

Notes

Citations

Sources 

 
  – 1646 to 1649
 
  (for his children)
 
  – 1643 to 1660
 
 
  – 1649 to 1664
  – Ab-Adam to Basing (for Abercorn)
 
  – England
 
  – (for timeline)
 
  – Short biographies in the biographical notes
 
 
 
  – Viscounts (for Butler, Viscount Mountgarret)
  – Viscounts (for Viscount Strabane)
 
  
  – Abercorn to Balmerino
  – Innermeath to Mar (for Boyd of Kilmarnock)
 
 
 
  – 1674 to 1700
  – Knights bachelors & Index
 
  – 1643 to 1660 and index

Further reading 
  – Snippet view
 The lost Settlement of Dunnalong
 lost Settlement of Dunnalong

 

 

Hamilton, George, 1st Baronet
Hamilton, George, 1st Baronet
Hamilton, George, 1st Baronet
English army officers
George
People from County Tyrone
People of the Irish Confederate Wars
Year of birth uncertain
Hamilton, George, 1st Baronet